Pink slip may refer to:

 Pink slip (U.S. automotive), In the United States also known as "certificate of title", a legal form, establishing a person or business as the legal owner of a vehicle
 Pink slip, a deprecated vehicle inspection paper in Australia
 Pink slip (employment), a form of termination notice
 Pink Slip, an EP released in 2009 by artist and singer Justin Bond
 Pink Slip, a fictional pop rock band from the film Freaky Friday (2003)

See also 

 Pink sheet (disambiguation)
 Pink (disambiguation)